The 2021 Eastern Illinois Panthers football team represented Eastern Illinois University as a member of the Ohio Valley Conference (OVC) during the 2021 NCAA Division I FCS football season. Led by Adam Cushing in his third and final season as head coach, the Panthers compiled an overall record of 1–10 with a mark of 1–5 in conference play, tying for sixth place in the OVC. The team played home games at O'Brien Field in Charleston, Illinois.

Previous season

The Panthers finished the 2020 season 1–5, 1–5 in OVC play to finish in last place.

Preseason

Preseason coaches' poll
The OVC released their preseason coaches' poll on July 19, 2021. The Panthers were picked to finish in last place.

Preseason All-OVC team
The Panthers had two players selected to the preseason all-OVC team.

Defense

Jason Johnson – LB

Special teams

Matt Judd – KR

Schedule

References

Eastern Illinois
Eastern Illinois Panthers football seasons
Eastern Illinois Panthers football